Laelia marginata is a species of orchid in the genus Laelia. Laelia marginata is found in Suriname.

References 

marginata
Orchids of Suriname